Four on the Floor is an American television program that aired on VH1 from 1994 to 1996. It was hosted by a panel of music critics who discussed the latest new releases. The program was nominated for a Cable Ace Award.

References

External links

1994 American television series debuts
English-language television shows
1996 American television series endings
VH1 original programming